In music, Op. 99 stands for Opus number 99. Compositions that are assigned this number include:
 Brahms – Cello Sonata No. 2
 Dvořák – Biblical Songs
 Schumann – Bunte Blätter